Kiara Nowlin (born November 27, 1995) is an American gymnast, World Champion power tumbler and an internationally ranked Cheerleader. She was a part of the 2007 World Age Games held in Quebec City, Quebec, Canada (WAG) Gold Medalist in Tumbling (11- to 12-year-old division), the 2008 and 2009 USAG Winter Classic First Place Tumbler (Junior Elite Division), and the 2009 USASF Gold Medal Young Athlete Merit Scholarship Recipient. She was at the 2009 World Age Games  held in St. Petersburg, Russia, gold medalist in tumbling (13- to 14-year-old division) and gold medalist in double-mini trampoline (13- to 14-year-old division). Nowlin also competed for the California Allstars in the Small Senior Co-Ed division (Smoed) and competed in the Unlimited Co-Ed division (Cali Coed), and has won three U.S. All Star Federation Cheerleading Worlds Gold medals with her team. She was on the acrobatic gymnastics team at Baylor University from 2013 to 2017.

Personal life
Nowlin started tumbling at the age of three at Gold Coast Gymnasts located in Ventura, California, landing her third back handspring at about three and a half years old. At age four, Nowlin's talent became recognized as she began performing at exhibitions with team gymnasts at Gold Coast, since she wasn't allowed to be on a competitive gymnastics team until age seven. However, at age five, Nowlin was scouted for an allstar cheerleading team. Although her original plan was to quit cheerleading at age seven when she could compete with her gymnastic team, she continued competing in both cheerleading and gymnastics. Nowlin has won seven scholarships and awards due to her athletic talent.

Trampoline and Tumbling achievements

USAG National Teams
 2010 Junior National Team Member, Power Tumbling
 2009 Junior National Team Member, Power Tumbling and Double Mini Trampoline
 2008 Junior National Team Member, Power Tumbling and Double Mini Trampoline
 World Age Group – Team Member, 2007, 2009, 2010; Power Tumbling and Double Mini Trampoline
 Region 2 Team Member, 2007
 JumpStart National Trampoline Team, National Team Member, 2007
 JumpStart National Tumbling Team, National Team Member, 2007
 T&T Region 2 Team Member, 2006
 JumpStart National Trampoline Team, National Team Member, 2006
 JumpStart National Tumbling Team, National Team Member, 2006
 JumpStart National Trampoline and Tumbling Team, National Team Member, 2005
 JumpStart National Trampoline and Tumbling Team, National Team Member, 2004

Trampoline and Tumbling National Competitions
2010 Visa Championships, Hartford, Conn. - 1st-TU (Jr. Div.)
2010 U.S. Elite Challenge, Virginia Beach, Va. - 1st-TU (Jr. Div.)
2009 Final Selection Event, Las Vegas, Nev. - 1st-TU; 7th-DM (Jr. Div.)
2009 Visa Championships, Dallas, Texas - 1st-TU, DM (Jr. Div.)
2009 Winter Classic, Birmingham, Ala. - 1st-TU; 6th-DM (Jr. Div.)
2008 Visa Championships, Houston, Texas - 1st-TU (Jr. Div.)
2008 U.S. Elite Challenge, Mobile, Ala. - 2nd-TU (Jr. Div.)
2008 Winter Classic, Tulsa, Okla. - 1st-TU; 4th-DM (Jr. Div.)
2006 U.S. Elite Challenge, Las Vegas, Nev. - 1st-TU (Open Age)

Trampoline and Tumbling International Competitions
2010 World Age Group Competition, Metz, France - 1st-TU (15-16) 
2009 World Age Group Competition, St. Petersburg, Russia - 1st-TU, DM (13-14) 
2009 Canada Cup, Okotoks, Alberta, Canada - 1st-TU, DM (Jr. Div.)
2007 World Age Group Competition, Quebec City, Quebec, Canada - 1st-TU (11-12)

Cheerleading achievements

Team Cheerleading results
2006 Cheerleading Worlds Bronze Medalist – CheerForce Simi Valley, Large Limited Co-ed
2007 Cheerleading Worlds Bronze Medalist – CheerForce Simi Valley, Large Limited Co-ed
2008 Cheerleading Worlds Bronze Medalist – CheerForce Simi Valley, Small Girl
2010 Cheerleading Worlds Silver Medalist – California All Stars, Large Unlimited Co-ed
2010 NCA National Champion, California All Stars, Large Unlimited Co-ed
2011 Cheerleading Worlds Gold Medalist – California All Stars, Large Unlimited Co-ed
2011 NCA National Champion, California All Stars, Large Unlimited Co-ed
2012 CheerLeading Worlds Gold Medalist - California All Stars, Small Co-ed (Smoed)
2012 NCA National Champion, California All Stars, Small Co-ed
2013 Cheerleading Worlds Gold Medalist – California All Stars, Small Co-ed (Smoed)

References

External links

Living people
1995 births
American gymnasts
American acrobatic gymnasts
American cheerleaders
Baylor Bears women's gymnasts
Female acrobatic gymnasts